The heats and finals for the women's 400 m individual medley race at the 2009 World Championships took place in the morning and evening of 2 August at the Foro Italico in Rome, Italy. The order of swimming in the medley is: butterfly, backstroke, breaststroke, freestyle.

Records
Prior to this competition, the existing world and competition records were as follows:

The following records were established during the competition:

Results

Heats

Finals

External links 
Heats Results
Finals Results

Medley Women's 400 m
2009 in women's swimming